"Pale Horses" (stylized as "pale horses") is a song by American electronica musician Moby. It was released as the second single from his ninth studio album Wait for Me on June 22, 2009. Vocals on the song are performed by Amelia Zirin-Brown.

Music video 
The "Pale Horses" music video was directed and animated by Elanna Allen. It features the alien "Little Idiot", depicted on the Wait for Me cover. The video depicts the alien, seeking company, creating several drawings which come to life, beginning with a replica of himself, which is washed away by rain. He later draws a dog and a train which he uses to travel to the Moon, where he draws an entire crowd of replicas to dance with, until they too are washed away by rain, leaving him alone once again.

Track listing 
 Limited edition 7-inch single 
 "Pale Horses"  – 3:28
 "Pale Horses"  – 5:14
 12-inch single 
 "Pale Horses"  – 7:36
 "Pale Horses"  – 6:46
 "Pale Horses"  – 4:28
 Digital single
 "Pale Horses" – 3:36
 "Pale Horses"  – 7:36
 "Pale Horses"  – 6:46
 "Pale Horses"  – 6:36
 "Pale Horses"  – 3:36
Bonus track – digital remixes single
 "Pale Horses"  – 3:30

Charts

References

External links 
 
 

2009 singles
Moby songs
Songs written by Moby
2009 songs
Mute Records singles